Will Warburton: A Romance of Real Life was George Gissing's last novel. It was published in 1905, two years after Gissing's death.

Plot summary
Will Warburton is a young gentleman of means, a man of commerce, who, losing everything in speculation, is forced into the life of a grocer, a thing he finds, at first, enormously tragic.

Will keeps his fate secret from his friends and his family and lives a life of humiliation and privation. It is only when the woman with whom he is falling in love discovers he is a grocer, and throws him over, that Will realizes that there is no shame in being a grocer.

Notes

Further reading
 Halperin, John (1985). Introduction to Will Warburton. London: Hogarth Press.
 Partridge, Colin (1981). Introduction to Will Warburton. Brighton, Sussex: The Harvester Press.

External links
 Will Warburton, at Internet Archive
 Will Warburton, at Project Gutenberg
 

1905 British novels
Novels by George Gissing
Novels published posthumously
Victorian novels
Novels set in England